Lady Darwin may refer to:

 Jane Harriet Ryle (1794–1866), wife of Sir Francis Sacheverel Darwin
 Ida Darwin (1854–1946), wife of Sir Horace Darwin
 Maud Darwin (1861–1947), wife of Sir George Darwin
 Florence Henrietta Darwin (1864–1920), 3rd wife of Sir Francis Darwin
 Katharine Pember Darwin (1901–1986), mathematician, wife of Sir Charles Darwin
 Ginette Darwin (?-2006), 2nd wife of Sir Robin Darwin